Ryan James George is a Welsh professional footballer who plays as a defender for Cymru Premier side Haverfordwest County.

Playing career

George is a product of the Newport County Academy. On 8 October 2019 George made his debut for Newport as a half time substitute for Elis Watts in the 2-0 defeat to Exeter City in the EFL Trophy Southern Group E. George was released by Newport County at the end of the 2019–20 season.

Career statistics

External links

References

Living people
Welsh footballers
Association football defenders
Newport County A.F.C. players
2001 births